Frederick Brice "Ted" Mitchell (August 4, 1905 – October 11, 1985) was an American football player. He played college football for Bucknell and in the National Football League (NFL) as a center for the Orange Tornadoes (1929) and Newark Tornadoes (1930). He appeared in 23 NFL games, 21 as a starter.

Born and raised in Madison, New Jersey, Mitchell played prep football at Madison High School.

References

1905 births
1985 deaths
Madison High School (New Jersey) alumni
Orange Tornadoes players
Newark Tornadoes players
Players of American football from New Jersey
People from Madison, New Jersey
Sportspeople from Morris County, New Jersey